

Y

References